The Yakovlev Yak-141 (NATO reporting name "Freestyle"), also known as the Yak-41, is a Soviet supersonic vertical takeoff/landing (VTOL) fighter aircraft designed by Yakovlev. Intended as a replacement for the Yak-38, it was designed as a supersonic fleet defence fighter capable of STOVL/VTOL operating from Soviet carriers. Four prototypes were built before the project's cancellation.

Design and development
Yakovlev always believed the Yak-38 to be an interim aircraft, developed to gain experience designing and developing military VTOL aircraft. Even before the Yak-38's introduction, the Soviet Navy desired a more comprehensive aircraft, with greater capabilities than the Yak-38 offered. The result was a design contract offered to Yakovlev in 1975. The requirement was for an aircraft with only one mission: air defense of the fleet. Unlike the Yak-38, this aircraft was to have sustained supersonic speed.  Maneuverability, radar and weapons loads were expected to be similar to those of current front-line fighters, such as the Su-27 and MiG-29. For the Soviet Navy this aircraft was to be their next generation VTOL fighter.  For Yakovlev the aircraft was viewed as a way of returning to designing Soviet fighter aircraft.

Because of the importance and complexity of the project, Alexander Sergeyevich Yakovlev assigned a large portion of his OKB to the development of the new VTOL fighter, with no fewer than ten chief engineers working simultaneously on what was called "Product 48" (the military had designated it Yak-41). Over fifty designs were studied. One key problem was designing an aircraft with both vectoring thrust and an afterburner, which was essential for sustained supersonic speeds. A twin-engine design was considered, but abandoned as the loss of an engine on landing would result in an immediate roll to the side. Eventually it was decided that the best arrangement was a single vectoring nozzle located just behind the center of gravity, as well as dedicated vertical thrust jets positioned just behind the cockpit.  A considerable amount of time was spent in the development of a flat, rectangular nozzle similar to that later employed on the American F-22 Raptor. Such a nozzle proved well-suited for the changes in configuration needed for both thrust vectoring and supersonic flight, and allowed for a thin, shallow tail. Ultimately, a circular nozzle was used, located between twin booms supporting the twin-finned tail.

Parts subject to excessive heat from the engines during landing were manufactured of titanium, and no less than 26% of the overall aircraft was to be manufactured of graphite or composite material. Because of heat build-up, hovering was restricted to no more than 2 minutes.

All three engines were controlled through an interlinked digital system, which was capable of controlling both engine start-up as well as modulating the thrust of all three engines during landing and hovering flight. Twin tandem reaction control jets were positioned at the wingtips, while a swiveling yaw jet was positioned under the nose.

The cockpit was pressurized and air-conditioned. The small canopy was bulletproof in front. It hinged to the right, but because of a long dorsal spine it had no rear vision. The ejection seat was automatically armed as soon as the engine duct was rotated past 30 degrees with an airspeed of less than 300 km/h (162 kn / 186 mph). The instrumentation in the prototypes was simple and similar to that planned for the earlier Yak-36M. The production version was to have been fitted with an extensive avionics and weapons suite including doppler radar, laser-TV ranging and aiming, as well as a heads-up multifunction display (HUD) which worked in connection with a helmet-mounted missile aiming system as found on the Mikoyan MiG-29.  This system allows the pilot to lock onto an enemy aircraft by turning his head as far as 80 degrees from front.

The undercarriage was tricycle, and equipped with the latest multi-disc, anti-skid brakes. The steerable nose wheel retracted to the rear, while the main gear retracted forward.

The top-mounted wing was similar to that of the Yakovlev Yak-36, though the outer panel swept back, and could be folded up for shipboard storage. The main engine was served by four side-mounted ducts as well as a row of large louvers along the upper surface to allow air to enter the engine during full power hovering. This engine was the R-79V-300, a two-shaft augmented turbofan with a bypass ratio of 1. Maximum thrust was 14,000 kg (30,864 lb). The rear nozzle could rotate from 0 degrees to 95 degrees for VTOL landing and hovering. The two lift engines were the RD-41 design, a simple single-shaft engine made mostly of titanium. Each had a thrust of 4,100 kg (9,040 lb).  The engines were installed behind the cockpit at an angle of 85 degrees. Like the Yak-38, the engines received their air through eight spring-operated dorsal flaps, and the exhaust exited through a belly opening covered by two ventral doors.

Yakovlev obtained funding for four prototypes. The first (48-0, with no callsign) was a bare airframe for static and fatigue testing. The second (48-1, call sign "48") was a non-flying powerplant testbed. The third and fourth (48-2 and 48-3, call signs "75" and "77") were for flight testing. While 48-1 remained unpainted, 48-2 and 48-3 were painted in overall grey, with a black radome and fin cap antennas.

Operational history
The first conventional flight, using 48–2, took place at Zhukovsky on 9 March 1987, with chief test pilot Sinitsyn at the controls. He made the first hovering flight on 29 December 1989 flying 48–3, and used the same aircraft to make the first complete transition from vertical to high-speed flight and vertical landing on 13 June 1990. From April 1991, various kinds of rolling take-off and run-on landings were performed on normal runways and also "ski-jump" ramps at the lift jet center at Saky. Throughout its testing, the aircraft demonstrated excellent combat maneuvers. Chief test pilot Sinitsyn went on to set twelve new world class records, but as the Yak-41 designation was classified, the records were submitted under the fictitious name "Yak-141". As a result, the previously unknown aircraft came to be known in the west as the "Yak-141". In 1992, Yakovlev repainted both flying aircraft in olive/grey camouflage, with the Russian tricolor insignia, and painted a white "141" on both aircraft in place of their previous call signs, "75" and 77".

On 26 September 1991, Sinitsyn made the first vertical landing on the aircraft carrier Admiral Gorshkov (ex-Baku) in 48-2. An hour later, Vladimir A. Yakimov landed 48-3 on the same deck. The pilots would go on to make eight flights from the ship until Yakimov made a hard landing on 5 October. The undercarriage ruptured a fuel tank, causing a serious fire.  After almost 30 seconds, Yakimov ejected successfully, and was rescued from the sea.  The aircraft was later repaired and placed on display.  That same month the Soviet Navy announced that no further funds were available to continue the program. The factory at Smolensk had anticipated this and had not constructed the tooling for production.

Yak-41 or Yak-141
The design was initially designated the Yak-41M by the Soviet military.  Once testing commenced, and the two prototypes began accumulating numerous world class records, it became necessary to invent a designation for use in the west, as the name Yak-41M was classified. The designation Yak-141 was selected, and it was by this name that the aircraft became known to western allies, though officially the aircraft's designation remained Yak-41M within the Soviet military. In 1991 Lockheed-Martin entered into partnership with Yakovlev to further develop an aircraft they had always known as the Yak-141. Largely as a result of this agreement, by 1992 Yakovlev changed the aircraft's designation to Yak-141 for the two flyable prototypes.  Series production in Russia could further change the designation.

Cooperation with Lockheed
Following the announcement by the CIS in September 1991 that it could no longer fund development of the Yak-41M, Yakovlev entered into discussions with several foreign partners who could help fund the program. Lockheed Corporation, which was in the process of developing the X-35 for the US Joint Strike Fighter program, stepped forward, and with their assistance aircraft 48-2 was displayed at the Farnborough Airshow in September 1992. Yakovlev announced that they had reached an agreement with Lockheed for funds of $385 to $400 million for three new prototypes and an additional static test aircraft to test improvements in design and avionics. Planned modifications for the proposed Yak-41M included an increase in STOL weight to 21,500 kg (47,400 lb). One of the prototypes would have been a dual-control trainer. Though no longer flyable, both 48-2 and 48-3 were exhibited at the 1993 Moscow airshow. The partnership began in late 1991, though it was not publicly revealed by Yakovlev until 6 September 1992, and was not revealed by Lockheed until June 1994.

Variants
Yak-41
The two flying prototypes and ground test article.
Yak-41M
Proposed production aircraft with large LERXs (leading-edge root extensions) and other improvements, particularly in the avionic suite.
Yak-43 (Izdeliye 201)
A proposed development of the Yak-41M 'Freehand' equipped with Kuznetsov NK-321 engines.
Yak-141
Designation originally applied to a single Yak-41 for disinformation and propaganda purposes when registering records with the FAI (Fédération Aéronautique Internationale) and later for promotional purposes by Yakovlev.

Operators

 Soviet Navy
 Soviet Naval Aviation

Surviving aircraft

 Yak-41M (s/n 48-2, call sign "75") is on display at the Central Air Force Museum at Monino. The aircraft is displayed in its 1992 livery with olive/grey camouflage markings.
 Yak-41M (s/n 48-3, call sign "77") is on display at the Yakovlev OKB Museum. The aircraft is displayed in its 1992 livery with olive/grey camouflage markings and "141" painted in white in place of the former call sign.

Specifications (Yak-41)

See also

References

External links

 Walkaround Yak-41 from Monino Museum (Russia)
 Yak-141 at AeroFlight 
 Yakovlev Yak-141 VTOL multi-role fighter at Military-Today 

Abandoned military aircraft projects of the Soviet Union
Carrier-based aircraft
1980s Soviet fighter aircraft
Twin-boom aircraft
Yak-141
Lift jet
Aircraft with auxiliary jet engines
Single-engined jet aircraft
High-wing aircraft
Aircraft first flown in 1987